Susan M. Tracy (born August 24, 1960, in Boston, Massachusetts) is an American political consultant and politician who represented the 19th Suffolk District in the Massachusetts House of Representatives from 1991 to 1995. She was a candidate in the 1998 Massachusetts 8th congressional district race. She finished eight out of ten candidates in the Democratic primary.

References

External links

1960 births
Politicians from Boston
Boston College alumni
Harvard Kennedy School alumni
American political consultants
Living people
Democratic Party members of the Massachusetts House of Representatives